Pieter Heerema was born on 6 June 1951 in Maracaibo (Venezuela), he is of Dutch nationality and an industrialist and amateur sailor who participates in the 2016–2017 Vendée Globe. Since 1989, he has been president of the Family Group Heerema which manufactures, among other things, drilling rigs.

Sailing career

He started his life in Venezuela but at the age of eleven, he came to live in the Netherlands and begins to sail on a Flits a small Dutch double dinghy popular with the youth  then moving onto the 470 and keelboats Yngling, J/22 and J/24.

He started sailing larger boats campaigning at a higher International level in both the Dragon and his RC44 on the boat named "No Way Back".

He participated in the 2016–2017 Vendée Globe with limited offshore racing and solo experience he was very much coming from the adventurer side. He said he wanted to completing the round-the-world trip in "an acceptable race time" in a racing situation. He initially was looked at chartering or used boats in good condition. But he end up buying his boat "No Way Back" that was being commissioned under the name "Vento di Sardegna" for  whose main sponsor was the region of Sardinia who no longer could support the project due to the economic crisis. So in September 2015 he got the brand new foiling generation IMOCA 60 designed by Verdier / VPLP design built in Bergamo Italy at the Persico Marine was launched in Lorient on 17 August 2015. He took on lots of advice from consultant includeding Michel Desjoyeaux and built up his experience qualified for the Vendée Globe by participating in April 2016 at the Calero Solo Transat between Lanzarote and Newport. He went on to be one of the oldest competitors to complete the race finishing 17th.

In 2019 he finished 2nd in Dragon Gold Cup on his boat called Troika. And in 2021 he finished 1st in Dragon Gold Cup in Marstrand on his boat NED-412 Troika.

Gallery

References

External links 
 
 Official Facebook Page
 Official YouTube Channel

1951 births
Living people
Dragon class sailors
IMOCA 60 class sailors
Dutch male sailors (sport)
Vendée Globe finishers
2016 Vendee Globe sailors
Dutch Vendee Globe sailors
Single-handed circumnavigating sailors